KSOX (1240 AM, "Visión Hispana") is a Spanish religious radio station in Raymondville, Texas.

History
KSOX received its license in 1957, reviving a set of calls once used on 1530 AM until it became KGBS in 1953.

KSOX for much of the 1990s and 2000s was an ESPN Radio affiliate, later switching to Fox Sports. In 2010, KSOX was sold to Visión Hispana; it simulcasted Fox Sports Radio with KVJY 840 until the sale of KSOX was finalized, at which time it changed formats to Spanish Religious.

References

External links
Vision Hispana Facebook

SOX
Willacy County, Texas